This is a list of the main career statistics of Argentine professional tennis player David Nalbandian.

Significant finals

Grand Slam finals

Singles: 1 (1 runner-up)

Year-end championships finals

Singles: 1 (1 title)

Masters 1000 finals

Singles: 6 (2 titles, 4 runners-up)

ATP career finals

Singles: 24 (11 titles, 13 runners-up)

Doubles: 1 (1 runner-up)

Other finals

Team competition: 3 (3 runners-up)

Junior Grand Slam finals

Singles: 2 (1 title, 1 runner-up)

Doubles: 1 (1 title)

Exhibition tournaments: 8 (8 titles)

Performance timelines 

Davis Cup matches are included in the statistics. Walkovers or qualifying matches are neither official wins nor losses.

Singles

Doubles 

Notes: 

1Nalbandian played for Argentina at the 2013 Davis Cup, but only signed up to play in doubles rubbers.

Record against top 10 players 
Nalbandian's match record against those who have been ranked in the Top 10:

Players who have been ranked world no. 1 are in boldface.

  Roger Federer 8–11
  Richard Gasquet 7–0
  Nikolay Davydenko 7–5
  Robin Söderling 6–1
  Tommy Robredo 6–3
  Rainer Schüttler 6–4
  Tim Henman 5–1
  Fernando González 5–3
  David Ferrer 5–9
  Mario Ančić 4–0
  Arnaud Clément 4–0
  Tomáš Berdych 4–1
  Nicolás Almagro 4–2
  Marin Čilić 4–2
  Juan Carlos Ferrero 4–3
  Carlos Moyá 4–3
  Ivan Ljubičić 4–5
  Nicolás Massú 3–1
  Juan Mónaco 3–1
  Juan Martín del Potro 3–1
  Félix Mantilla 3–2
  Lleyton Hewitt 3–3
  Marat Safin 3–6
  Stanislas Wawrinka 3–6
  Jonas Björkman 2–0
  Albert Costa 2–0
  Karol Kučera 2–0
  Sébastien Grosjean 2–1
  John Isner 2–1
  Mark Philippoussis 2–1
  Gilles Simon 2–1
  Paradorn Srichaphan 2–1
  Radek Štěpánek 2–1
  Guillermo Cañas 2–2
  Guillermo Coria 2–2
  Thomas Johansson 2–2
  Mikhail Youzhny 2–2
  Marcos Baghdatis 2–3
  Janko Tipsarević 2–3
  Andy Roddick 2–4
  Andy Murray 2–5
  Rafael Nadal 2–5
  Gustavo Kuerten 1–0
  Todd Martin 1–0
  Marc Rosset 1–0
  Wayne Ferreira 1–1
  Nicolas Kiefer 1–1
  Jürgen Melzer 1–1
  Jiří Novák 1–1
  Jo-Wilfried Tsonga 1–1
  Gaël Monfils 1–3
  Novak Djokovic 1–4
  Andre Agassi 0–1
  Gastón Gaudio 0–1
  James Blake 0–2
  Mardy Fish 0–2
  Yevgeny Kafelnikov 0–2
  Fernando Verdasco 0–3
  Tommy Haas 0–5

 *As of April 1, 2013.

Wins over top 10 players per season 

Tennis career statistics